Gilbert A. Dater High School is a public high school, combined with grades 7 and 8, located in the Western Hills area of Cincinnati, Ohio.  It is part of the Cincinnati Public Schools.  The first graduating class was in 2003.

Gilbert A. Dater High School is located on the west side of Cincinnati.  The school currently serves students in grades 7–12. Founded in 2000, the school is one of only two schools in the Cincinnati Public School District to offer the Special College Preparatory Program (SCPP) (the other being Walnut Hills High School). To be admitted to this program students are required to pass a rigorous academic assessment. The school also provides courses in 3 modern languages (German, French, and Spanish); a unique three-week summer program for incoming 7, 8, and 9 grade students; an honors/AA program; AP; a unique culinary vocational program; as well as exciting extracurricular activities. In addition, it has a state of the art student health center, a Multiple Disability Unit, an excellent ESL/ELL program, as well as tutoring/college access information from GEAR UP and Cincinnati Youth collaborative.

Dater is also noteworthy for being the Alma Mater of Sgt. Joshua Hargis (Class of 2007), who was injured while serving on duty as a soldier in Afghanistan. The picture of him in bed saluting, even while in pain and severely injured, gained national news as "the Salute Seen Around the world." Dater is known for its dedication to our nation's veterans/servicemen, especially the annual Dater memorial day concert.

From 1967 to 1999 the school was known as Dater Junior High School and was located at 2848 Boudinot Ave. Cincinnati, Ohio. It moved to its current location at 2146 Ferguson Rd. Cincinnati, Ohio 45238. It shares a campus with Western Hills High school.

References

External links

 
 District Website

Cincinnati Public Schools
High schools in Hamilton County, Ohio
Public high schools in Ohio
Public middle schools in Ohio
Educational institutions established in 2000
2000 establishments in Ohio